Jibran Khan (born 31 December 1989) is a Pakistani cricketer. He made his first-class debut for Peshawar in the 2007–08 Quaid-e-Azam Trophy on 1 November 2007.

References

External links
 

1989 births
Living people
Pakistani cricketers
Peshawar cricketers
Place of birth missing (living people)